The Witch Doctor and Other Essays is an anthology of essays written by Laxmi Prasad Devkota. It was published on November 11, 2017, by Sangri-La Books. The book consists of 30 essays. Although Devkota primarily wrote in Nepali, he wrote the essays in the collection in English. This is the fifty-ninth book of the author and was published posthumously by his son Padma Devkota.

Synopsis 
The major subject of the essays ranges from animals to Nepalese society to stars and different human lifestyle. The essays were written in and around 1958 in Devokta's last years.

Reception 
The book was released in the 108th birth anniversary ceremony of the poet. Prof. Michael J. Hutt called the essays "powerful resonance for present-day Nepal" in an article for The Record magazine.

See also 

 Muna Madan
 Shakuntala
 Abstract Chintan Pyaj

References 

21st-century Nepalese books
Nepalese essay collections
2017 essays
Books by Laxmi Prasad Devkota
Nepalese non-fiction books
English books by Nepalese writer
Nepalese literature in English